Arpad Szakolczai is a sociologist and political anthropologist, author of numerous books and articles, emeritus professor of Sociology at University College Cork, and was ERC panel member 2011-2018.  An editor and board member of VoeglinView, the publication of the Eric Voeglin Society.

Scholarly Opinions 

 Reflecting on the Tarde—Durkheim debate of 1903, he has argued that Gabriel Tarde should be recognized as a founding figure of political anthropology, and has critiqued the dominance of Emile Durkheim in sociology. In an article from 2011, co-authored with Bjorn Thomassen.
 Sparked by Eric Voegelin's reading of Husserl's The Crisis of European Sciences and Transcendental Phenomenology, on the friendship and critical correspondence between Voegelin and Alfred Schütz, sympathetic to the former's critique of the Cartesian-Kantian-Husserelian rationalist phenomenology.
 In critique of comedy theater and the modern public arena, he has commented on the friendship between German composer / conductors Richard Wagner and August Rockel, especially during the time of 1849 Dresden uprising.

Selected Publications

References and Notes

External links 

 

Hungarian sociologists
Physical anthropologists
Academics of University College Cork